Defined in the narrowest sense, glycobiology is the study of the structure, biosynthesis, and biology of saccharides (sugar chains or glycans) that are widely distributed in nature. Sugars or saccharides are essential components of all living things and aspects of the various roles they play in biology are researched in various medical, biochemical and biotechnological fields.

History
According to Oxford English Dictionary the specific term glycobiology was coined in 1988 by Prof. Raymond Dwek to recognize the coming together of the traditional disciplines of carbohydrate chemistry and biochemistry. This coming together was as a result of a much greater understanding of the cellular and molecular biology of glycans. However, as early as the late nineteenth century pioneering efforts were being made by Emil Fisher to establish the structure of some basic sugar molecules. Each year the Society of Glycobiology awards the Rosalind Kornfeld award for lifetime achievement in the field of glycobiology.

Glycoconjugates

Sugars may be linked to other types of biological molecule to form glycoconjugates. The enzymatic process of glycosylation creates sugars/saccharides linked to themselves and to other molecules by the glycosidic bond, thereby producing glycans.  Glycoproteins, proteoglycans and glycolipids are the most abundant glycoconjugates found in mammalian cells. They are found predominantly on the outer cell membrane and in secreted fluids. Glycoconjugates have been shown to be important in cell-cell interactions due to the presence on the cell surface of various glycan binding receptors in addition to the glycoconjugates themselves. In addition to their function in protein folding and cellular attachment, the N-linked glycans of a protein can modulate the protein's function, in some cases acting as an on-off switch.

Glycomics

"Glycomics, analogous to genomics and proteomics, is the systematic study of all glycan structures of a given cell type or organism" and is a subset of glycobiology.

Challenges in the study of sugar structures
Part of the variability seen in saccharide structures is because monosaccharide units may be coupled to each other in many different ways, as opposed to the amino acids of proteins or the nucleotides in DNA, which are always coupled together in a standard fashion. The study of glycan structures is also complicated by the lack of a direct template for their biosynthesis, contrary to the case with proteins where their amino acid sequence is determined by their corresponding gene.

Glycans are secondary gene products and therefore  are generated by the coordinated action of many enzymes in the subcellular compartments of a cell. Since the structure of a glycan may depend on the expression, activity and accessibility of the different biosynthetic enzymes, it is not possible to use recombinant DNA technology in order to produce large quantities of glycans for structural and functional studies as it is for proteins.

Modern tools and techniques for glycan structure prediction
Advanced analytical instruments and software programs, when used in combination, can unlock the mystery of glycan structures. Current techniques for structural annotation and analysis of glycans include liquid chromatography (LC), capillary electrophoresis (CE), mass spectrometry (MS), nuclear magnetic resonance (NMR) and lectin arrays.

One of the most widely used techniques is mass spectrometry which uses three principal units: the ionizer, analyzer and detector.

Glycan arrays, like that offered by the Consortium for Functional Glycomics and Z Biotech LLC, contain carbohydrate compounds that can be screened with lectins or antibodies to define carbohydrate specificity and identify ligands.

Multiple reaction monitoring (MRM)
MRM is a mass spectrometry-based technique that has recently been used for site-specific glycosylation profiling.  Although MRM has been used extensively in metabolomics and proteomics, its high sensitivity and linear response over a wide dynamic range make it especially suited for glycan biomarker research and discovery. MRM is performed on a triple quadrupole (QqQ) instrument, which is set to detect a predetermined precursor ion in the first quadrupole, a fragmented in the collision quadrupole, and a predetermined fragment ion in the third quadrupole. It is a non-scanning technique, wherein each transition is detected individually and the detection of multiple transitions occurs concurrently in duty cycles. This technique is being used to characterize the immune glycome.

Medicine
Drugs already on the market, such as heparin, erythropoietin and a few anti-flu drugs, have proven effective and highlight the importance of glycans as a new class of drug. Additionally,  the search for new anti-cancer drugs is opening up new possibilities in glycobiology. Anti-cancer drugs with new and varied action mechanisms together with anti-inflammatory and anti-infection drugs are today undergoing clinical trials. They may alleviate or complete current therapies. Although these glycans are molecules that are difficult to synthesize in a reproducible way, owing to their complex structure, this new field of research is highly encouraging for the future.

Skin
Glycobiology, in which recent developments have been made possible by the latest technological advances, helps provide a more specific and precise understanding of skin aging.
It has now been clearly established that glycans are major constituents of the skin and play a decisive role in skin homeostasis.
 They play a crucial role in the recognition of molecules and cells, they act, most notably, at the surface of cells to deliver biological messages.
 They are instrumental in the metabolism of cells: synthesis, proliferation and differentiation
 They have a role to play in the structure and architecture of tissue.
Vital to the proper functioning of skin, glycans undergo both qualitative and quantitative changes in the course of aging. The functions of communication and metabolism are impaired and the skin's architecture is degraded.

See also
Sugar signal transduction
Glycan-protein interactions

References

External links
 Vendor Glycoconjugates, Glycan Recognizing Proteins
 The Functional Glycomics Gateway.   monthly updated web resource, a  collaboration of Nature and the Consortium for Functional Glycomics.
Carolyn Bertozzi's Seminar: "Chemical Glycobiology"
 
 http://www.healthcanal.com/medical-breakthroughs/22037-UGA-scientists-team-define-first-ever-sequence-biologically-important-carbohydrate.html

 
Branches of biology
Biochemistry
Glycomics
Carbohydrates